Aminta Thomas (born 31 October 1990) is an Australian team handball player. She plays for the Sydney University HC, and on the Australian national team. She represented Australia at the 2013 World Women's Handball Championship in Serbia.

References

Australian female handball players
1990 births
Living people